David Rasmussen may refer to:

 David Rasmussen (footballer) (born 1976), Danish footballer
 David M. Rasmussen, American philosopher
 David Tab Rasmussen (1958–2014), American biological anthropologist